.sd is the Internet country code top-level domain (ccTLD) for Sudan.

2nd level domains
 com.sd - Companies
 net.sd - Network providers and ISPs
 org.sd - Sudanese NGOs
 edu.sd - Sudanese universities and colleges
 med.sd - Medical
 tv.sd - TV channels and Electronic media
 gov.sd - Sudanese government and ministries
 info.sd - Newspapers, information, and media

Second top domain
A new top domain string using Arabic letters, سودان, was reserved for Sudan in November 2012.

References

External links
 IANA .sd whois information

Country code top-level domains
Communications in Sudan

sv:Toppdomän#S